The 2004 Chattanooga Mocs football team represented the University of Tennessee at Chattanooga as a member of the Southern Conference (SoCon) in the 2004 NCAA Division I-AA football season. The Mocs were led by second-year head coach Rodney Allison and played their home games at Finley Stadium. They finished the season 2–9 overall and 2–5 in SoCon play to tied for fifth place.

Schedule

References

Chattanooga
Chattanooga Mocs football seasons
Chattanooga Mocs football